Ctenoplon x-littera is a species of beetle in the family Cerambycidae, the only species in the genus Ctenoplon.

References

Ibidionini
Monotypic Cerambycidae genera